Los Gatos usually refers to Los Gatos, California, an incorporated town in Santa Clara County, California, United States.

Los Gatos may also refer to:

 Los Gatos (band), a 1960s Argentine rock band
 Los Gatos Creek (Fresno County, California)
 Los Gatos Creek (Santa Clara County, California)
 Los Gatos Creek Park
 Los Gatos Creek Trail

See also
 Gato (disambiguation)
 The Cats (disambiguation), English translation